The Space Negros was a late 1970s experimental rock band that disbanded, and regrouped in the early 1980s.

History
Space began as an avantgarde four-person Boston-based group in the late 1970s. Composer-pianist Erik Lindgren was the major domo of this ensemble, which used a DECtalk voice synthesizer in their 1986 song "Robot." One of the band's records was actually a reissue of a 1980 release.

References

American alternative rock groups